Acacia mollifolia, commonly known as the hairy silver wattle, velvet acacia and hoary silver wattle is a species of Acacia native to eastern Australia.

Description
The terete branchlets have low pale rusty to silvery grey coloured ridges. Following flowering leathery seed pods form that are densley covered in silver-grey-brown hairs. The pods are straight to slightly curved and vaguely resemble a string of beads.

Taxonomy
The specific epithet is formed from the Latin words mollis meaning soft or pliant and folium meaning leaf in reference to the soft and hairy leaves of the plant.
It is closely related to Acacia fulva.

Distribution
A. mollifolia is endemism to the central tablelands and central western slopes of New South Wales with the bulk of the population found to the west of Peakhill, Boorowa and Bathurst areas to around Rankins Springs where it is often situated on sandstone ridges and on alluvial plains a part of dry sclerophyll forest or woodland communities dominated by species of Eucalyptus and Callitris.

See also
 List of Acacia species

References

mollifolia
Fabales of Australia
Flora of New South Wales
Plants described in 1927
Taxa named by Joseph Maiden
Taxa named by William Blakely